The National Hassanat short film festival in Esfahan was primarily established in Esfahan in 2010, with the aim to promote the charity and benefaction culture by Hassanat Islamic Cultural Promotion and Development Center that is one of the active NGOs in Esfahan with over five years of history behind it
The main aim of this festival is encouraging young filmmakers to deal with the subjects such as humanity, helping the humankind and regenerating good but forgotten traditions of the community. Submission of above 4000 short feature films, documentaries, scripts, animations and video clips from over 2000 young filmmakers and play writers of the country during 4 years of holding this festival indicate the attention and considerations of the artists in the community towards this prominent humanitarian and morale subject.
Holding training courses in critic framework and analysis of the works by the great Iranian cinematographers and screening selected films of different periods of the festival during the year show the consideration of the authorities holding the festival towards promoting the knowledge level of the young filmmakers and screenwriters of the society.
One of the considerable points of this festival could be the memorial ceremonies for the beneficial artists of the country.

References

Short film festivals
Film festivals established in 2010
Film festivals in Iran